is a Japanese professional wrestler currently working for the Japanese promotion Tokyo Joshi Pro Wrestling, where she is a former International Princess Champion.

Professional wrestling career

Tokyo Joshi Pro Wrestling (2018–present)

Watanabe is best known for her time in Tokyo Joshi Pro Wrestling. She made her professional wrestling debut on January 4, 2018 at TJPW Tokyo Joshi Pro '18 where she teamed up with Pinano Pipipipi as the "Up Up Girls" to defeat stablemates Hikari Noa and Raku. Watanabe is known for being part of Up Up Girls Kakko Kari which is a popular idol group in Japan. Watanabe soon began pursuing for different championships. At 5th Anniversary Shinkiba Tour 2018 on November 4, she unsuccessfully participated in a 12-woman gauntlet battle royal for both the Princess of Princess Championship and the Ironman Heavymetalweight Championship won by Maki Itoh and also involving Shoko Nakajima, Reika Saiki, Yuki Kamifuku, Yuna Manase and others. On the same night, Watanabe teamed up with Hikari Noa and Miyu Yamashita to defeat Hinano, Mizuki and Yuka Sakazaki. At Wrestle Princess III on October 9, 2022, Watanabe defeated Alex Windsor to win the International Princess Championship. On March 18, 2023, at Grand Princess '23, Watanabe dropped the title to Rika Tatsumi, ending her reign at 160 days.

DDT Pro Wrestling (2018–present)
Due to TJPW being under the same CyberFight flagship, Watanabe has competed in various of DDT Pro Wrestling's events. She made her first appearance at DDT Tokyo Idol Festival 2018 on August 3, where she teamed up with her Up Up Girls stablemates Hikari Noa, Pinano Pipipipi, Raku, and Danshoku Dino to defeat Hyper Misao, Makoto Oishi, Yuki Kamifuku, Akari Saho, Aya Kajishima, Mayu Yoshikawa and Sanshiro Takagi. Watanabe also participated in some of DDT's signature events such as DDT Judgement, making her first appearance at the Judgement 2019: DDT 22nd Anniversary on February 17, where she teamed up with Hikari Noa and Natsumi Maki in a losing effort against Bakurestu Sisters (Nodoka Tenma, Yuki Aino) and Yuna Manase as a result of a six-woman tag team match. At DDT Street Pro Wrestling In Tokyo Idol Festival 2019 on August 2, Watanabe competed in another battle royal for the Ironman Heavymetalweight Championship won by Momomi Wagatsuma who dethroned the previous champion Yukio Sakaguchi. The match also involved other notable opponents such as Yukio Naya and other idols like Natsumi Misake and Rise Shiokawa. Another signature event in which Watanabe competed was the DDT Ultimate Party, making her first appearance at the Ultimate Party 2019 edition from November 3, where she teamed up with Rika Tatsumi as "Hakuchuumu" and defeated Neo Biishiki-gun (Misao and Sakisama) to win the Princess Tag Team Championship.

Pro Wrestling Noah (2021)
At CyberFight Festival 2021, a cross over event promoted by all DDT, TJPW and Pro Wrestling Noah on June 6, 2021, Watanabe teamed up with Rika Tatsumi and unsuccessfully fought Shoko Nakajima and Hyper Misao, and Bakuretsu Sisters (Nodoka Tenma and Yuki Aino).

Championships and accomplishments
Pro Wrestling Illustrated
Ranked No. 57 of the top 150 female singles wrestlers in the PWI Women's 150 in 2022
Tokyo Joshi Pro Wrestling
Princess Tag Team Championship (1 time) – with Rika Tatsumi
International Princess Championship (1 time)
Futari No Princess Max Heart Tournament (2022) – with Rika Tatsumi

References

1999 births
Living people
Japanese female professional wrestlers
21st-century professional wrestlers
People from Saitama Prefecture
Sportspeople from Saitama Prefecture